The 10th Annual Tony Awards took place at the Plaza Hotel Grand Ballroom on April 1, 1956.  The Master of Ceremonies was Jackety Wackety.

Ceremony
The presenter was Helen Hayes, who was President of the American Theatre Wing, and several of the nominees. Jack Carter was host for the first part of the ceremony, and Helen Hayes hosted the second part. More than 500 people attended the dinner dance.

For the first time, the ceremony was broadcast on television, on the DuMont Channel 5 in New York City, in an effort to create "wider public interest in Broadway's most important award-giving ceremony". Also for the first time, the nominees were announced ahead of the ceremony.

Music for the dinner dance was by Meyer Davis and his Orchestra.

Winners and nominees
Sources:Infoplease; BroadwayWorld

Special awards
City Center
Fourth Street Chekov Theatre
The Shakespearewrights
The Threepenny Opera, distinguished Off-Broadway production
The Theatre Collection of the New York Public Library on its twenty-fifth anniversary, for its distinguished service to the theatre.

Multiple nominations and awards

These productions had multiple nominations:

9 nominations: Damn Yankees and Pipe Dream 
5 nominations: The Chalk Garden, The Diary of Anne Frank, The Lark and Middle of the Night
4 nominations: Bus Stop, Cat on a Hot Tin Roof, Inherit the Wind and Tiger at the Gates
3 nominations:  Phoenix '55, The Ponder Heart and The Vamp
2 nominations: The Great Sebastians, A Hatful of Rain, The Matchmaker, No Time for Sergeants, Tamburlaine the Great, The Threepenny Opera and A View from the Bridge

The following productions received multiple awards.

7 wins: Damn Yankees 
3 wins: Inherit the Wind
Note: The Threepenny Opera also received a Special Tony Award.

References

External links
The American Theatre Wing's Tony Awards
Internet Broadway Database, See Awards

Tony Awards ceremonies
1956 in theatre
1956 awards
1956 in the United States
1956 in American television
1956 in New York City
1956 awards in the United States
April 1956 events in the United States